Simpson Glacier Tongue is a small floating glacier tongue nourished by Simpson Glacier and Fendley Glacier as it extends into the sea between Nelson Cliff and Atkinson Cliffs, along the north coast of Victoria Land. Charted by the Northern Party, led by Campbell, of the British Antarctic Expedition, 1910–13. Named for Dr. (later Sir) George Clarke Simpson, meteorologist of the expedition.

Glaciers of Pennell Coast